And Then There Was Eve is a 2017 American drama film directed by Savannah Bloch. It stars Tania Nolan, Rachel Crowl, Mary Holland, Karan Soni, and John Kassir.

Cast
 Tania Nolan as Alyssa
 Rachel Crowl as Eve
 Mary Holland as Laura
 Karan Soni as Zain
 John Kassir as G. Alexander
 Anne Gee Byrd as Blythe
 Isley Reust as Bartender
 Jenica Bergere as Robyn
 Mike Erwin as Neil
 Dominic Bogart as Julian
 Crystal Marie Denha as Doreen
 Christine Weatherup as Gabby
 Jack Cullison as Maxwell
 Jake Dynabursky as Timmy
 Rizi Timane as Tom

References

External links
 

2017 films
Films shot in Los Angeles
American drama films
2017 drama films
2010s English-language films
2010s American films